The German champions in the sport of ice hockey since 1912.

German champions (men's)

1912-1948: German Ice Hockey Championship

1949-58: Oberliga FDR

1949-1990 DDR-Oberliga

1958-94: Eishockey-Bundesliga

 Until 1990, the Bundesliga covered only West Germany. After the reunification of the country, East German clubs took part in the competition too.

1995 - current: DEL 

 1994–95 Kölner Haie
 1995–96 Düsseldorfer EG
 1996–97 Adler Mannheim
 1997–98 Adler Mannheim
 1998–99 Adler Mannheim
 1999–00 Munich Barons
 2000–01 Adler Mannheim
 2001–02 Kölner Haie
 2002–03 Krefeld Pinguine
 2003–04 Frankfurt Lions
 2004–05 Eisbären Berlin
 2005–06 Eisbären Berlin
 2006–07 Adler Mannheim
 2007–08 Eisbären Berlin
 2008–09 Eisbären Berlin
 2009–10 Hannover Scorpions
 2010–11 Eisbären Berlin
 2011–12 Eisbären Berlin
 2012–13 Eisbären Berlin
 2013–14 ERC Ingolstadt
 2014–15 Adler Mannheim
 2015–16 EHC München
 2016–17 EHC München

German champions (women's)

See also
 Austrian champions (ice hockey)
 Ice hockey in Germany
 German Cup (ice hockey)

External links 
 Official DEB website

 
Champions
C
Champions
DDR-Oberliga (ice hockey)
list